Ahmed Said (born 15 April 1976) is a Pakistani first-class cricketer who played for Abbottabad cricket team.

References

External links
 

1976 births
Living people
Pakistani cricketers
Abbottabad cricketers
Cricketers from Mardan
Rawalpindi cricketers